Acidbubblepunk is the sixth full-length studio album by garage rock band The Original Sins, released in 1994 through Psonik records. The album is considered by many fans as a disappointing record, with Trouser Press referring to the record as a "disappointing drop in [The Original Sins'] standards". The album cover was drawn by frontman John Terlesky.

Track listing

Personnel
John Telersky - Vocals, guitar, artwork
Ken Busseire - Bass
Dan McKinney - Organ
Seth Baer - Drums

References

1994 albums
The Original Sins albums